The southern spotted velvet gecko (Oedura tryoni), also known commonly as Tryon's velvet gecko, is a species of lizard in the family Diplodactylidae. The species is endemic to Australia.

Etymology
The specific name, tryoni, is in honor of English scientist Henry Tryon (1856–1943).

Geographic range
O. tryoni is found in northeastern New South Wales and southeastern Queensland, Australia.

Habitat
The preferred natural habitats of O. tryoni are forest and rocky areas.

Reproduction
O. tryoni is oviparous.

References

Further reading
Bustard HR (1966). "The Oedura tryoni complex: east Australian rock-dwelling geckos. (Reptilia: Gekkonidae)". Bulletin of the British Museum (Natural History), Zoology 14 (1): 1–14 + Plates 1–3.
Cogger HG (2014). Reptiles and Amphibians of Australia, Seventh Edition. Clayton, Victoria, Australia: CSIRO Publishing. xxx + 1,033 pp. .
De Vis CW (1884). "On New Australian Lizards". Proceedings of the Royal Society of Queensland 1: 53–56. (Œdura tryoni, new species, pp. 54–55).
Laube, Andreas (2001). "Erfahrungen bei der Haltung und Zucht von Oedura tryoni De Vis 1884 ". Sauria 23 (4): 41–46. (in German).
Rösler H (1995). Geckos der Welt – Alle Gattungen. Leipzig: Urania. 256 pp. (Oedura tryoni, p. 82). (in German).
Wilson, Steve; Swan, Gerry (2013). A Complete Guide to Reptiles of Australia, Fourth Edition. Sydney: New Holland Publishers. 522 pp. .

Oedura
Geckos of Australia
Reptiles described in 1884
Taxa named by Charles Walter De Vis